Nomads of the Nine Nations is a supplement published by Iron Crown Enterprises (I.C.E.) in 1990 for the fantasy role-playing campaign setting Shadow World that uses either the Rolemaster or the Fantasy Hero role-playing rules system.

Description
Nomads of the Nine Nations introduces a new campaign region, the vast plains on the isle of Thuul that are inhabited by a nomadic people called the Jan. The book provides details of the Jan culture, including: 
the geography, climate, and the flora and fauna of the plains; 
physical appearances and dress of the nine different tribes of the Jan, as well as their languages, history, beliefs, laws and taboos; 
social organization
notable personalities
military aspects of the society, including weapons
magic specific to the Jan
Some adventure ideas are presented, as well as six short scenarios.

Players can use either the role-playing rules for Rolemaster, or the rules for Fantasy Hero.

Publication history
I.C.E. published the role-playing system Rolemaster in 1980, and immediately introduced the Shadow World campaign setting the same year. In the mid-1980s, I.C.E. took over Hero Games and their Hero System of role-playing rules, including the specialized set of rules for fantasy campaigns called Fantasy Hero. The supplement Nomads of the Nine Nations was published ten years later in 1990, a 72-page softcover book written by Brian E. Potter, with illustrations by Jeff Menges, cartography by Kevin Williams, and cover art by Richard Hescox.

Reception
Herb Petro reviewed the product in a 1991 issue of White Wolf Magazine, noting it would be useful for those looking for something different in the Shadow World realm, and gave it an average rating of 3 out of a possible 5 overall.

References

Role-playing game supplements introduced in 1990
Rolemaster supplements
Shadow World (role-playing game)